Along With the Gods is a South Korean manhwa series written and illustrated by Joo Ho-min. The webtoon was released on Internet portal Naver WEBTOON since 2010, and the first volume in print was published on November 16, 2012. It was adapted into a film, Along with the Gods: The Two Worlds, which released on December 20, 2017, with a sequel, Along with the Gods: The Last 49 Days, releasing August 1, 2018. Two additional sequels are in active development as of September 2022.

References

External links
Official webtoon on Naver Webtoon

Manhwa titles
Naver Comics titles
2010 webtoon debuts
South Korean webtoons
Manhwa adapted into films
Fiction about the afterlife
Comics based on myths and legends
2010s webtoons
Webtoons in print